John Henry Chapman (1860 – 27 February 1942) was a British businessman active in Sheffield steel companies, and a philatelist who signed the Roll of Distinguished Philatelists in 1926. He was a specialist in the stamps of Queensland.

References

Signatories to the Roll of Distinguished Philatelists
1860 births
1942 deaths
British philatelists
Fellows of the Royal Philatelic Society London
British businesspeople